Richard Barnett may refer to:
Sir Richard Barnett (politician) (1863–1930), Irish sport shooter and MP
Richard David Barnett (1909–1986), Keeper, Department of Western Asiatic Antiquities of the British Museum
Dick Barnett (Richard Barnett, born 1938), American basketball player
Sir Richard Barnett (economist) (born 1952), Vice-Chancellor of Ulster University, 2006–2015
Richie Barnett (born 1972), New Zealand rugby league footballer
Richard Barnett (historian) (born 1980), British medical historian
Richie Barnett (rugby league, born 1981), English rugby league footballer
Richard Barnett (Capitol rioter), participant in the 2021 United States Capitol attack

See also
Richard Barnet (1929–2004), American scholar-activist